The Dublin quays refers to the two roadways and quays that run along the north and south banks of the River Liffey in Dublin, Ireland. The stretches of the two continuous streets have several different names. However, all but two of the names (Bachelors Walk and Usher's Island) share the same "quay" designation. The quays have played an important part in Dublin's history.

Much of the southern roadway and about half of the northern roadway is part of the R148 road, while the other half of the northern roadway is part of the R801 road.

Routes description
 Both roadways run approximately 4.3 km (2.7 mi) from Sean Heuston Bridge in the west. The eastern end of the north roadway is at East-Link Bridge while the south roadway turns southward at the Grand Canal. Seventeen bridges cross the river along the line of the quays; three of them for pedestrian use only, one a railway bridge, two on which Luas trams run, and the remainder for vehicular and pedestrian use.

The name designations of the north roadway are (from west to east): Wolfe Tone Quay, Sarsfield Quay, Ellis Quay, Arran Quay, Inns Quay, Ormond Quay Upper, Ormond Quay Lower, Bachelors Walk, Eden Quay, Custom House Quay and North Wall Quay.

The name designations of the south roadway are (from west to east): Victoria Quay, Usher's Island, Usher's Quay, Merchant's Quay, Wood Quay, Essex Quay, Wellington Quay, Crampton Quay, Aston Quay, Burgh Quay, George's Quay, City Quay, Sir John Rogerson's Quay and Britain Quay.

A majority of the roadways in the city centre are one-way with the north roadway being eastward and the south being westward.

History
 
Vikings were among the first settlers in Dublin and many Viking artefacts were found at what is now Wood Quay. The quays were first developed during the time of King John in the early 13th century when the monarch licensed citizens to erect buildings on the River Liffey. They became the centre of the Irish shipping trade until the 1800s when the river in this section was considered too shallow for the more modern heavy ships.

On 11 March 1597, a substantial gunpowder explosion took place on the quays. The explosion demolished as many as forty houses and left dozens of others badly damaged. The explosion claimed the lives of 126 people and inflicted countless injuries.

The Custom House, one of Dublin's major landmarks on Custom House Quay, was completed in 1791. The quay takes its namesake from the building. Later, the Four Courts on Inns Quay was completed in 1802 and is currently home to the Supreme Court of Ireland and the High Court. Both were designed by noted architect James Gandon.

Burgh Quay is named after Elizabeth Burgh, wife of Anthony Foster whose son was Rt. Hon. John Foster, last speaker of the Irish House of Commons. Burgh Quay was once the site of the Tivoli Theatre. The Corn Exchange Building, designed by George Halpin in 1815, was approved by the Wide Streets Commission in 1816 and work commenced on this building soon afterwards. Its granite facade still remains on Burgh Quay. Shipping came as far upstream as Burgh Quay until 1879 when Butt Bridge was constructed. A number of the buildings on Burgh Quay (including number 8) still retain remnants of the shopfronts designed for the Wide Streets Commissioners.

The 20th century saw much development in the quays. In 1845, McBirney, Collis & Company opened a store at 16 and 17 Aston Quay, and remained on the site as a department store as McBirney's until 1984. The building incorporated a set of three three-bay houses on the site, which was later remodelled in 1865. The building still retains the original store frontage of the department store. The building was later occupied by a Virgin Megastore from 1986, and is now a branch of the supermarket chain, SuperValu. A controversial development was at Wood Quay by the Dublin Corporation in the late 1970s, when there were many archaeological Viking finds.  This led to a very public and unsuccessful campaign to halt the development. Among the other quays that lost period buildings in the 1980s was Arran Quay, when 5 Georgian houses were demolished illegally in January 1989 by Linders of Smithfield.

Announced in 1998 and with the first phase opened in late 2000, the Liffey Boardwalk is a series of pedestrian walkways which were developed along the quays in the early 21st century.

On 21 February 2004, near the Clarence Hotel on Wellington Quay, a Dublin Bus lost control and mounted the pavement, crashing into a queue of 30 people boarding another bus to Maynooth. Five people were killed and 14 injured. The city's south quays were closed as rescue workers attended the scene. Driving conditions on the day were noted as being dry and clear and the driver was tried for dangerous driving causing death. His trial began in February 2007 at Dublin Circuit Court, but he was acquitted. It was found that the most likely cause of the accident had been a power surge in the engine. Volvo Bus Ltd, the manufacturers of Dublin Bus engines, said they were aware of "other cases of power surges in Ireland" in their engines.

In 2006, local politicians proposed renaming some of the quays.  MEP Gay Mitchell proposed renaming George's Quay or Victoria Quay to Joyce Quay or Behan Quay, for the Irish writers James Joyce and Brendan Behan.

Dublin quays in culture
A Picturesque and Descriptive View of the City of Dublin, a set of 25 architectural prints of well-known buildings and views in Dublin, illustrated in 1791 by the engraver, watercolourist, and draughtsman James Malton include a selection of scenes along the quays.

A number of artists have found inspiration from the quays. In 1898, author Frances A. Gerard described the Dublin quays as follows: "Much of the picturesque appearance of Dublin is due to the Quays which intersect the City and the Bridges which span the Liffey; they impart to it a foreign air resembling the Quays of Paris." Irish novelist James Joyce had many of his storylines take place at the Dublin quays, including "Eveline" (1904) and "An Encounter" (1914). Joyce biographer Michael H. Begnal wrote, "Joyce associated the Liffey Quays with the desire for escape."

Artist Jack Butler Yeats painted Dublin Quays in 1916.

The 1987 film The Dead, adapted from a story by Joyce, was filmed by John Huston at Usher's Island. In Joyce's story, "The Dead", the sisters Kate and Julia Morkan host their annual dance at their "dark gaunt house on Usher's Island". 'Ushers Island' was the name of a competitor in the 1994 Grand National at Aintree, falling at the third fence. In 2015, folk musician Andy Irvine launched a band called 'Usher's Island' (a reference to the Dublin quay), with members including Dónal Lunny, Paddy Glackin and Michael McGoldrick.

Bachelors Walk was a comedy-drama aired on RTÉ during March 2001, following the lives of three bachelors who lived on the titular quay.

Rudyard Kipling began his poem "Belts" with the lines: 
"There was a row in Silver Street, that's near to Dublin Quay / Between an Irish regiment an' English cavalree."

Notable buildings and locations along the Dublin quays
3Arena, previously the Point Depot and the O2 (North Wall Quay)
Central Bank of Ireland (North Wall Quay)
Church of the Immaculate Conception, aka "Adam and Eve's" (Merchant's Quay)
CHQ Building (Custom House Quay)
Clarence Hotel (Wellington Quay)
Collins Barracks (separated from Wolfe Tone Quay by Croppies' Acre Memorial Park)
Convention Centre Dublin (North Wall Quay)
The Old Custom House (Wellington Quay) (demolished c.1814)
The Custom House (Custom House Quay)
Dublin City Council Civic Offices (Wood Quay)
Dublin Port (east of the quays, towards Dublin Bay)
EPIC The Irish Emigration Museum (Custom House Quay)
Four Courts (Inns Quay)
George's Dock (Custom House Quay)
Guinness Brewery (Victoria Quay)
Heuston railway station (near Victoria Quay)
International Financial Services Centre (Custom House Quay and North Wall Quay)
Liberty Hall (Eden Quay)
Merchants' Hall (Wellington Quay) 
Poolbeg Chimneys (east of the quays, towards Dublin Bay)
Poolbeg Lighthouse (east of the quays, towards Dublin Bay)
Royal Hibernian Marine School (Sir John Rogerson's Quay) (demolished 1979)
Smock Alley Theatre (Essex Quay)
Sunlight Chambers (Essex Quay)
Temple Bar (Essex Quay, Wellington Quay, Crampton Quay and Aston Quay)

References

Dublin Docklands
Quays in Dublin (city)